Los Diablos is a 33-RPM LP album by Venezuelan composer/arranger/conductor Aldemaro Romero, released in 1962 by the record label Cymbal.
Performed by Aldemaro Romero and his Salon Orchestra.
The name and the cover of the album, are dedicated to the Venezuelan tradition of the Dancing Devils of Corpus Christi day.

Track listing

1962 albums
Aldemaro Romero albums
Albums produced by Aldemaro Romero